The Copa del Presidente de la República 1934 (President of the Republic's Cup) was the 34th staging of the Copa del Rey, the Spanish football cup competition.

The competition started on March 11 and concluded on May 6 with the final, held at the Montjuïc Stadium in Barcelona. Madrid won their 6th title.

Teams
As in the previous tournaments, the teams qualified through the Regional Championships:
Asturias (2): Oviedo FC, Sporting de Gijón
Balearic Islands (1): CD Constancia
Canary Islands (1): CD Tenerife
Cantabria (1): Racing de Santander
Catalonia (3): FC Barcelona, CD Español, CD Sabadell
Galicia (3): Club Celta, Deportivo La Coruña, Racing Ferrol
Gipuzkoa–Navarre–Aragon (4): Donostia FC, CD Logroño, CA Osasuna, Zaragoza FC
Murcia (2): Murcia FC, Hércules FC
Northern Africa (1): Ceuta Sport
Center-South Region (4): Madrid FC, Athletic Madrid, Sevilla FC, Betis Balompié
West Region (1): Club Recreativo Onuba
Valencia (2): Valencia FC, Levante FC
Biscay (3): Athletic Bilbao, Baracaldo FC, Arenas Club

Round of 32
The first leg was played on March 11. The second leg was played on March 18. 

|}
Athletic Bilbao, Madrid FC, Oviedo FC and Donostia FC received a bye.

Tiebreaker

|}

Round of 16
The first leg was played on March 25. The second leg was played on April 1.

|}

Quarter-finals
The first leg was played on April 8. The second leg was played on April 15.

|}
Tiebreaker

|}

Semi-finals
The first leg was played on April 22. The second leg was played on April 29.

|}

Final

Topscorers
Jose Vilanova 11 Goals

References

External links
rsssf.com
 linguasport.com

1934
1934 domestic association football cups
1933–34 in Spanish football